Agustín García Íñiguez (born 3 May 1985), commonly known as Agus, is a Spanish former professional footballer who played as a central defender.

Club career
Agus was born in Bonete, Province of Albacete. After appearing in seven La Liga games for eventually relegated Albacete Balompié in the 2004–05 season, he was bought by Real Madrid for €600,000 and immediately sent to its B team.

As Castilla were relegated from the Segunda División in 2006–07, Agus, alongside coach Míchel's son Adrián, were loaned to another side in that level, RC Celta de Vigo, with very different individual fates. The former returned to Real's reserves for the 2008–09 campaign.

In the subsequent summer, Agus signed for three years with Córdoba CF, with his previous club holding 50% of his rights. In the following years, safe for one season in the Turkish Süper Lig with Orduspor, he continued competing in his country's second tier, representing AD Alcorcón, RCD Mallorca and Albacete.

On 27 January 2016, Agus signed with Houston Dynamo of Major League Soccer. Released on 9 June 2017, the following month the 32-year-old moved to the Danish 1st Division and joined Esbjerg fB on a two-year deal.

Agus signed for ATK of the Indian Super League on 26 July 2019, from Nea Salamina Famagusta FC.

Career statistics

Club

References

External links

1985 births
Living people
Sportspeople from the Province of Albacete
Spanish footballers
Footballers from Castilla–La Mancha
Association football defenders
La Liga players
Segunda División players
Segunda División B players
Tercera División players
Atlético Albacete players
Albacete Balompié players
Real Madrid Castilla footballers
RC Celta de Vigo players
Córdoba CF players
AD Alcorcón footballers
RCD Mallorca players
Süper Lig players
Orduspor footballers
Major League Soccer players
USL Championship players
Houston Dynamo FC players
Rio Grande Valley FC Toros players
Danish Superliga players
Danish 1st Division players
Esbjerg fB players
Cypriot First Division players
Nea Salamis Famagusta FC players
Indian Super League players
ATK (football club) players
Spain youth international footballers
Spanish expatriate footballers
Expatriate footballers in Turkey
Expatriate soccer players in the United States
Expatriate men's footballers in Denmark
Expatriate footballers in Cyprus
Expatriate footballers in India
Spanish expatriate sportspeople in Turkey
Spanish expatriate sportspeople in the United States
Spanish expatriate sportspeople in Denmark
Spanish expatriate sportspeople in Cyprus
Spanish expatriate sportspeople in India